Homna Upazila is an upazila of Comilla District in the Division of Chittagong, Bangladesh.  Homna thana (now an upazila) was established in 1918.

Geography
It has 36,814 households and a total area of 180.13km2. The river Meghna and branch of Titas named Sativanga passes through Homna.

Demographics

According to the 2011 Census of Bangladesh, Homna upazila had a population of 206,386 living in 40,370 households. Its growth rate over the decade 2001-2011 was 7.80%. Homna has a sex ratio of 1059 females per 1000 males and a literacy rate of 39.67%. 29,173 (14.14%) live in urban areas.

Administration
Homna Upazila is divided into Homna Municipality and nine Union Parishads Asadpur, Chanderchor, Dulalpur, Garmora, Ghagutia, Joypur, Mathabhanga, Nilokhi and Vashania. The union parishads are subdivided into 70 moujas and 154 villages. On the other hand Homna Municipality is subdivided into 9 wards and 13 mahallas.

See also
Upazilas of Bangladesh
Districts of Bangladesh
Divisions of Bangladesh

References

 
Upazilas of Comilla District